Howard Everest Hinton  (24 August 1912 – 2 August 1977) was a British entomologist and Professor who studied beetles.

Education and early life
Howard Hinton grew up in Mexico and attended the University of California, Berkeley as an undergraduate. He received his PhD from the University of Cambridge in 1939 for research on Mexican water beetles . During World War II he worked on the problem of storage of food products to counter the depredation of moths and beetles.

Career
After his PhD, Hinton worked at the Natural History Museum, London. In 1949, he moved to the University of Bristol where he spent the rest of his career.

Hinton published 309 scientific papers, many of which were concerned with insect morphology and taxonomy. He founded and edited the Journal of Insect Physiology. He introduced an extra stage in the metamorphosis of insects, the pharate stage, in which the insect has produced a new exoskeleton in preparation for ecdysis but is still enclosed in the remnants of the old one. He was an early proponent of continental drift, based on the close relationship between non-migratory water beetles of the family Elmidae in rivers in New Guinea and northern Australia. He worked extensively on insect eggs, particularly the way in which they respire.  He worked for many years on cryptobiosis, experimenting with a species of African fly that could withstand long periods of dehydration, positing that this might also be the key to space voyaging. In an article in New Scientist, October 1965 he suggested that contrary to the idea that life had evolved from the sea, complex molecules from the earth's atmosphere might have survived long periods of desiccation before being washed down to the sea. His graduate students include Robin Baker and Geoff Parker.  His papers are stored at the University of Bristol, where he worked. Most of his insect collection is housed at the Natural History Museum, London.

Awards and honours
Hinton was elected as Fellow of the Royal Society (FRS) in 1961.

Personal life
Howard Hinton married Margaret Clark, a teacher and sister of Colin Clark, in 1938 and they had four children: Charlotte, who became a head teacher; James Hinton, who served as a professor of history at the University of Warwick; Geoffrey Hinton, who is a professor of computer science at the University of Toronto; and Teresa, who is a social policy researcher in Tasmania. Howard's father, George Hinton, was a mining engineer and botanist who managed a silver mine in Mexico and collected many new botanical specimens, some of which are in Kew gardens. Howard Hinton's nephew, also called George Hinton, has a farm in Mexico and discovered a new genus of cacti, Geohintonia, that are named after him.

Howard Hinton was a great-grandson of George Boole, the founder of mathematical logic. His cousins include Joan Hinton, one of the few women scientists at Los Alamos who later moved to Beijing, and William Hinton who wrote Fanshen, a book about the Chinese revolution which he observed firsthand while working for the United Nations in China in 1949. His grandfather, Charles Howard Hinton was a mathematician who worked on the concept of four-dimensional space and had to leave Victorian England when he was found guilty of bigamy.

References

1912 births
1977 deaths
Fellows of the Royal Society
British entomologists
Coleopterists
Academics of the University of Bristol
University of California, Berkeley alumni
Employees of the Natural History Museum, London
Alumni of King's College, Cambridge
Place of birth missing
20th-century British zoologists
Hinton family